Tamboré Biological Reserve is a municipal biological reserve in  greater São Paulo, Brazil.

Description

The reserve is in the Tamboré bairro of the Santana de Parnaíba municipality in greater São Paulo, and is owned by the municipality.
With an area of  it is one of the largest conservation areas in the metropolitan area.
The Brookfield Institute, through an arrangement with the municipality, draws up programs and projects for the conservation of the reserve. The reserve includes conservation units within which human interference is not allowed other than to help conserve its natural balance, biological diversity and natural ecological processes. 
Visitation is allowed only for environmental education and scientific research.

Notes

Sources

Biological reserves of Brazil
Protected areas of São Paulo (state)
Protected areas of the Atlantic Forest